Ssireum or Korean wrestling is a folk wrestling style and  traditional national sport of Korea that began in the fourth century.

In the modern form each contestant wears a belt (satba) that wraps around the waist and the thigh. The competition employs a series of techniques, which inflict little harm or injury to the opponent: opponents lock on to each other's belt, and one achieves victory by bringing any part of the opponent's body above the knee to the ground.

Etymology 
There have been other terms for "wrestling" in Korean used alongside ssireum, such  as gakjeo (각저:角抵), gakhui (각희:角戱), gakryeok (각력:角力), gakji (각지:角支), chiuhui (치우희:蚩尤戱), sangbak (상박:相撲), jaenggyo (쟁교:爭交). 
Gak (각:角), a commonly used prefix, seems to have originated from the combative act performed by horned animals such as oxen when competing against one another for the superiority of physical strength.

Mechanics
Ssireum wrestlers seek to turn the opponent's torso from about 45 degrees to 90 degrees when throwing. This is mostly done by shifting the opponent's weight onto their leg then pushing back their weight toward the floor.

History 
The earliest evidence of ssireum dates back to the Goguryeo period. Originally used in military applications, ssireum became a popular pastime of the people, including many Korean kings, during the Goryeo and Joseon periods.

In traditional life, ssireum was a popular activity on the Korean holiday of Dano, the fifth day of the fifth lunar month, and tournaments are held in the summer and autumn. Ssireum competitions were also held on other days such as the Third Day of the Third Moon, the Eighth day of the Fourth Moon and Buddhist All Souls' Day.. The traditional prize at a tournament was an ox, a valuable commodity in an agriculturally based society and symbolizing the strength of the contestant.

In the 20th century, ssireum became a nationally televised sport in South Korea.
The first modern competition was held in 1912 at Dansongsa theater in Seoul.

Korean wrestling has been referred to as ssireum since the 1920s. The Pan Chosun Ssireum Federation was founded in 1927. Since 1947, the competition organized by the Ssireum Federation has been called the National Ssireum Championship Contest. Weight classes were introduced at  the 12th edition of this competition and revised in 1967. There are two traditional styles of ssireum: a "right-sided" style predominant in parts of Gyeonggi Province and the Honam region of southern Korea and a "left-side" style favored in the Gyeongsang and Chuncheong provinces. The difference depends on the way the satba is fastened. In 1994, the Korean Ssireum Federation proposed the unification of ssireum into a single left-sided style as the official style to be used by all competitors.

Cultural heritage status 
Following an unprecedented joint application by both South and North Korea, Ssireum was inscribed in the UNESCO Intangible Cultural Heritage Lists. It is also enlisted as the 131st Intangible Cultural Property.

Method of competition 

Ssireum is conducted within a circular ring, measuring approximately 7 meters in diameter, which is covered with mounded sand. The two contestants begin the match by kneeling on the sand in a grappling position (baro japki), each grabbing a belt—known as a satba (샅바)—which is wrapped around his opponent's waist and thigh. The wrestlers then rise while retaining their hold on the other's 'satba.' The match is awarded to the wrestler who forces the other contestant to touch the ground with any part of his body at knee level or higher. Unlike sumo, pushing your opponent outside of the ring does not warrant a win, just a restart. Normally, professional ssireum is contested in a best-out-of-three style match.

There are 3 judges, a chief referee and three sub referees. The chief judge is positioned inside the ring, whereas the sub referees are located on the outside of the ring, one to the right and others to the left. If an unfair judgment is called or the chief referee is unable to render a decision, the sub referees can request a revocation of the decision or a rematch. In addition, they can recommend the cessation of the match when an injury occurs. The referees' decisions throughout the competition are absolute and held in the highest regard, meaning that athletes cannot challenge any judgments declared during the match.

Today there are also women Ssireum wrestlers. Women wrestle only among themselves but follow the same rules (except that men are topless whereas women wear tops).

There are 4 weight classes in professional wrestling: flyweight (Taebaek, 75 kg), lightweight (Geumgang, 90 kg), middleweight (Halla, 105 kg), and heavyweight (Baekdu, under 160 kg), named after the four famous peaks in Korea.

Traditionally Ssireum was contested with the top portion of the trousers rolled down to provide grip. The use of "satba" was invented with the birth of professional Ssireum in the mid-20th century. There is a movement to restore this traditional method of grip, in the spirit of maintaining its cultural and traditional roots, but it has met with some resistance as the use of "satba" has become entrenched in the modern form.

The professional league is dwindling in popularity and many wrestlers have turned their attention to mixed martial arts fighting, even though Ssireum involves no striking or submissions of any kind, as a means of making a living. Choi Hong-man, former champion of Ssireum, enjoyed notable success in the K-1 scene. Unfortunately, the future of professional Ssireum remains bleak, with only one team remaining. However, it can also be argued that Ssireum is beginning to undergo global expansion as a popular martial arts sport, alongside taekwondo and hapkido.

It is important to note the differences between Ssireum and sumo. Ssireum has remained largely a national/traditional sport. Physical hits such as slaps and blows are not permitted in Ssireum, though they are in sumo. In both sports, the competitors are often quite large, though Korean wrestlers tend to be leaner. However, size does not guarantee success in either sport. Although both sports are quite similar, they differ in characteristics as well as values.

The national governing body of the sport in Korea, Korean Ssireum Organization, has made a claim that Ssireum is characterized as a "peaceful competition focusing on harmony and unison", reflecting the "philosophical outlook of the Korean Race".

Events

World Championships 
The first  World Ssireum Championships were held in September 2008 during the Busan World TreX-Games, but these were unofficial competitions. The official first championships were held in Siauliai, Lithuania, and a total of 120 wrestlers from 40 countries participated in the two-day event, according to the World Ssireum Federation (WSF). The first Asia Ssireum Championship and fifth World Ssireum Championship took place simultaneously at Thuwana National Indoor Stadium in Yangon, Myanmar, from September 18 to 23 of 2015.

Korean Championship (unlimited) 
The Korean Ssireum Championships have unlimited weight class in addition to four weight classes. The champions of this class are called the "Cheonhajangsa". (meaning the strongest man under the sky)

Gallery

See also 

 Kene (Naga wrestling)
 Mongolian wrestling
 Sumo
 Alysh
 Yağlı güreş
 Pahlavani

References

External links 

  Korean Ssireum Association: 대한씨름협회
 Korea Ssireum Research Institute
 Korean Festival
 History of Ssireum in Korea

 
Folk wrestling styles
Korean games
Sports originating in Korea
Intangible Cultural Heritage of Humanity
Important Intangible Cultural Properties of South Korea